Viktor Zhylin (9 January 1923 – 14 October 2009) was a Ukrainian football defender and forward and manager, the master of sports, the honored trainer of Ukraine.

Player career
Zhylin was born in the city of Tahanrih (today Taganrog), Donets Governorate.

Since childhood, playing in local Krylya Sovetov Taganrog, was a member of the Great Patriotic War. After winning back to his favorite things to football. He played for FC Dinamo Kursk and FC Dinamo Voronezh. As a player Zhylin had successful stint with FC Dynamo Kyiv. Also played for FC Zenit Leningrad, FK Daugava Rīga and FC OBO Kyiv. He was nicknamed 'Berkut' during his Dynamo Kyiv stint.

Coaching career
Graduation High School Coaches and the Kyiv Institute of Physical Education. Stood in the legendary origins of FC Lokomotyv Vinnytsia, and by managing this team, in 1959 became the champion of the Ukrainian SSR. He worked with football clubs: FC Avangard Kharkiv, FC Zirka Kirovohrad, FC Avtomobilist Zhytomyr, FC Chornomorets Odesa, FC Metalurh Zaporizhzhia, FC Spartak Ivano-Frankivsk, FC Kryvbas Kryvyi Rih, FC Mashynobudivnyk Borodyanka, FC Dnipro Cherkasy, FC Systema-Boreks Borodyanka.

The most famous disciples of Viktor Zhylin: Viktor Prokopenko, Valeriy Porkuyan, Semen Altman, Yevhen Kotelnykov and Leonid Buryak. 14 October 2009, a 87-year life through serious disease, Viktor Stepanovych Zhylin died.

Honours

Player
 Soviet Top League Runner-Up: 1952
 Football Cup of the Ukrainian SSR: 1947, 1948

Coach
 Soviet Class B (Ukraine): 1959

References

External links
 
 Artur Valerko, Yuriy Malyshev. Football at the Zhylin Street (Футбол на вулиці Жиліна). Ukrainian Association of Football. 9 June 2011
 Profile at football.odessa.ua 
 Profile at football.ua 

1923 births
2009 deaths
Sportspeople from Taganrog
People from Donetsk Governorate
Soviet footballers
Soviet football managers
Ukrainian footballers
Ukrainian football managers
FC Dynamo Kyiv players
FC Zenit Saint Petersburg players
Daugava Rīga players
FC CSKA Kyiv players
FC Chornomorets Odesa managers
FC Dnipro Cherkasy managers
FC Kryvbas Kryvyi Rih managers
FC Metalist Kharkiv managers
FC Metalurh Zaporizhzhia managers
FC Nyva Vinnytsia managers
FC Polissya Zhytomyr managers
FC Spartak Ivano-Frankivsk managers
FC Zirka Kropyvnytskyi managers
FC Systema-Boreks Borodianka managers
Ukraine student football team managers
Association football defenders
Association football forwards